Dermatan-sulfate epimerase is an enzyme that in humans is encoded by the DSE gene.

The protein encoded by this gene is an epimerase required for biosynthesis of dermatan sulfate and a tumor-rejection antigen. This antigen possesses tumor epitopes capable of inducing HLA-A24-restricted and tumor-specific cytotoxic T lymphocytes in cancer patients and may be useful for specific immunotherapy. This gene product is localized to the endoplasmic reticulum. Two transcript variants encoding the same protein have been found for this gene.

Clinical significance 
 Ehlers-Danlos syndrome Musculocontractural type is associated with mutations in the DSE gene.

References

Further reading